Keren is a name of Hebrew origin. Notable people named Keren include:


Arts

Music
 Keren Ann (born 1974), singer-songwriter based in Paris
 Keren DeBerg, American singer-songwriter
 Keren Hadar, crossover soprano from Israel
 Keren Peles (born 1979), Israeli singer-songwriter and a pianist
 Keren Woodward (born 1961), English pop singer and songwriter

Other arts
 Keren Craig (born 1976), English-Swiss fashion designer
 Keren Cytter (born 1977), Israeli visual artist and writer
 Keren Mor (born 1964), Israeli actress and comedian
 Keren Yedaya (born 1972), Israeli filmmaker

Sports
 Keren Barratt (born 1946), English former football referee
 Keren Leibovitch (born 1973), Israeli champion Paralympic swimmer
 Keren Regal (born 1977), Israeli former Olympic swimmer
 Keren Shlomo (born 1988), Israeli tennis player
 Keren Siebner (born 1990), Israeli Olympic swimmer
 Keren Ugle (born 1979), Australian rules footballer 
 Keren Boadu(born 2008), Ghana a track runner

Other people
 Keren Elazari (born 1980), Israeli-born cyber security analyst and senior researcher
 Keren Everett, American-born linguist and Christian missionary
 Keren Neubach (born 1970), Israeli journalist, television presenter, and radio presenter
 Keren Rice (born 1949), Canadian linguist
 Keren Tendler (died 2006), Israeli soldier

Surname

 Hanan Keren (born 1952), Israeli basketball player

See also
 Keren (disambiguation)